Tachina magna is a species of fly in the genus Tachina of the family Tachinidae that can be found in such European countries as Albania, Bulgaria, France, Greece, Italy, Romania, Spain, and Ukraine.

References

Insects described in 1890
Diptera of Europe
magna